Neil Ryan Edwards (born 5 December 1970) is a Welsh former footballer who played as a goalkeeper, before retiring in 2006. He also played for Wales's under 21s. After his retirement, he has since been coaching Carlisle United and Bolton Wanderers goalkeepers. He is coaching Liverpool's U-18 goalkeepers as of the 2012–13 season.

Playing career
Edwards started his career as a reserve goalkeeper at Leeds United, playing one first team match, a Full Members Cup game against Barnsley. He also went on loan to Huddersfield Town, but failed to play a first team match.

On 3 September 1991 Edwards joined Stockport County for £5,000, where he played over 200 games for the Cheshire club, but first team opportunities were restricted due to the team's elevated position in 1996–97.

On 3 November 1997 Edwards joined Rochdale, where he found himself a fans' favourite, and played his part in one of the best defensive records in Division 3. In the pre-season of the 2001–02 season, Edwards was named the captain of Rochdale, but injury made him miss the majority of the season due to injury. In the latter seasons, injuries and the impressive performances of Matthew Gilks forced Edwards out of the first team picture at Spotland. In total, he played 279 League and Cup games at Rochdale.

Edwards then had two contracts offered to him, by Rochdale and Bury, and on 2 July 2005, he joined Bury on a one-year contract, with the guarantee of first-team football as well as a slightly higher wage. "Taff" played 24 League games for the Mancunian Gigg Lane club, before an injury ended his season, and he decided to retire at the end of season.

Coaching career
In summer 2006 Edwards joined new Carlisle United manager Neil McDonald's backroom team as goalkeeping coach, but left to Bolton Wanderers to become their assistant goalkeeping coach to Fred Barber.

In August 2009 he appeared in a Bolton Legend's game for long serving goalkeeper Jussi Jääskeläinen in what was a warm up event prior to the main game against Hibernian.

Sources

Leeds United fans profile
football.co.uk profile

1970 births
Living people
Footballers from Aberdare
Welsh footballers
Wales youth international footballers
Wales under-21 international footballers
Association football goalkeepers
Leeds United F.C. players
Huddersfield Town A.F.C. players
Stockport County F.C. players
Rochdale A.F.C. players
Bury F.C. players
English Football League players
Bolton Wanderers F.C. non-playing staff
Liverpool F.C. non-playing staff